Anse-d'Hainault is a commune in the Anse-d'Hainault Arrondissement, in the Grand'Anse department of Haiti.

Towns and villages in Anse-d'Hainault include: Anse-d'Hainault, Decotelette, Dossous, Duchanino, Escamel and Peligrin.

References

Populated places in Grand'Anse (department)
Communes of Haiti